Portugal competed at the 1976 Summer Olympics in Montreal, Canada.

A delegation of nineteen competitors participated in six sports, conquering, for the first time, two silver medals in one Olympiad and one olympic medal in the athletics. The long-distance runner and future marathon olympic champion Carlos Lopes conquered, here in Montreal, the first of its two olympic medals.

Medalists

Silver
 Carlos Lopes — Athletics, 10000m
 Armando Silva Marques — Shooting, Trap

Results by event

Athletics
Men's 400m:
 José de Jesus Carvalho
 Round 1 (heat 6) — 48.47 (→ 7th, did not advance)

Men's 800m:
 Fernando Mamede
 Round 1 (heat 2) — 1:49.58 (→ 5th, did not advance)

Men's 1500m:
 Fernando Mamede
 Round 1 (heat 2) — 3:37.98 (→ 3rd)
 Semi-final (heat 1) — 3:42.59 (→ 8th, did not advance)

 Helder Baiona de Jesus
 Round 1 (heat 1) — 3:44.20 (→ 2nd)
 Semi-final (heat 2) — 3:47.37 (→ 8th, did not advance)

Men's 5000m:
 Aniceto Silva Simões
 Qualifying (heat 3) — 13:21.93 (→ 6th, qualified as 2nd fastest loser)
 Final — 13:29.38 (→ 8th)

 Carlos Lopes
 Qualifying (heat 2) — did not participate

Men's 10000m
 Carlos Lopes
 Qualifying (heat 1) — 28:04.53 (→ 1st)
 Final — 27:45.17 (→  Silver Medal)

Men's 400m Hurdles:
 José de Jesus Carvalho
 Round 1 (heat 1) — 50.99 (→ 4th)
 Semi-final — 49.97 (→ 2nd)
 Final → 49.94 (→ 5th)

Men's Marathon:
 Anacleto Pereira Pinto — 2:18:53.4 (→ 22nd)
 Carlos Lopes — did not participate

Judo
Men's Lightweight (–63 kg):
 José Gomes 
Group B
 Round 1 — Mustapha Belahmira (MAR) (→ forfeited)
 Round 2 — Osman Yanar (TUR) (→ won by jury decision)
 Round 3 — Hector Rodriguez (CUB) (→ lost by ippon)
 Repêchage — Marian Standowicz (POL) (→ lost by yuko)

Men's Light Middleweight (–70 kg):
 António Roquete Andrade 
Group A
 Round 1 — Koji Kuramoto (JAP) (→ lost by jury decision)
 Repêchage — Juan-Carlos Rodriguez (ESP) (→ lost by koka)

Sailing
Men's Double-Handed Dinghy (470):
 Joaquim Leça Ramada and Francisco Antunes Mourão — 137 pts (→ 21st)
{|class=wikitable style="text-align:center;"
!Race!!1!!2!!3!!4!!5!!6!!7!!rowspan=2|Total!!rowspan=2|Net
|-
!Place
|18||18||14||9||28||22||20
|-
!Pts
|24||24||20||15||34||28||26||171||137
|}

Shooting
Trap:
 Armando Silva Marques — 189 hits (→  Silver Medal) 
{|class=wikitable
!Round!!1!!2!!3!!4!!5!!6!!7!!8!!Total
|- align=center
!Hits
|22||24||24||25||23||24||25||22||189
|}

Swimming
Men's 100m Freestyle:
 José Gomes Pereira
 Heats (heat 6) — 55.46 (→ 7th, did not advance)

Men's 200m Freestyle:
 Paulo Frischknecht
 Heats (heat 5) — 2:02.65 (→ 7th, did not advance)
 José Gomes Pereira
 Heats (heat 4) — 2:03.03 (→ 6th, did not advance)

Men's 400m Freestyle:
 Rui Pinto de Abreu
 Heats (heat 4) — 4:28.43 (→ 7th, did not advance)

Men's 1500m Freestyle:
 António Botelho Melo
 Heats (heat 4) — 17:24.31 (→ 6th, did not advance)

Men's 4 × 200 m Freestyle Relay:
 António Botelho Melo, José Gomes Pereira, Paulo Frischknecht and Rui Pinto de Abreu
 Heats (heat 2) — 8:26.68 (→ 5th, did not advance)

Men's 100m Backstroke:
 António Botelho Melo
 Heats (heat 3) — 1:05.76 (→ 7th, did not advance)

Men's 200m Backstroke:
 António Botelho Melo
 Heats (heat 1) — 2:26.65 (→ 7th, did not advance)

Men's 100m Breaststroke:
 Henrique Carvalho Vicêncio
 Heats (heat 2) — 1:13.55 (→ 7th, did not advance)

Men's 200m Breaststroke:
 Henrique Carvalho Vicêncio
 Heats (heat 3) — 2:41.97 (→ 7th, did not advance)

Men's 100m Butterfly:
 Paulo Frischknecht
 Heats (heat 4) — 1:01.97 (→ 7th, did not advance)

Men's 200m Butterfly:
 Paulo Frischknecht
 Heats (heat 4) — 2:20.54 (→ 5th, did not advance)

Men's 400m Individual Medley:
 António Botelho Melo
 Heats (heat 3) — 5:11.48 (→ 7th, did not advance)

Men's 4 × 100 m Medley Relay:
 António Botelho Melo, Henrique Carvalho Vicêncio, José Gomes Pereira and Paulo Frischknecht
 Heats (heat 2) — 4:20.84 (→ 8th, did not advance)

Wrestling
Men's Greco-Roman Flyweight (–52 kg):
 Leonel Duarte
 Round 1 — Mohamed Karmous (MAR) (→ opponent disqualified; –4 pts)
 Round 2 — Rolf Krauss (GER) (→ won by fall; –8pts: did not advance)

Men's Greco-Roman Bantamweight (–57 kg):
 Luís Grilo
 Round 1 — Ali Lachkar (MAR) (→ opponent disqualified; –4 pts)
 Round 2 — Doug Yeats (CAN) (→ won by fall)
 Round 3 — Joseph Sade (USA) (→ lost by 30:1; –8 pts: did not advance)

Men's Greco-Roman Featherweight (–62 kg):
 Joaquim Jesus Vieira
 Round 1 — Stoyan Lazarov (BUL) (→ lost by fall; –4 pts)
 Round 2 — Kazimier Lipien (POL) (→ lost by fall; –8 pts: did not advance)

Officials
 Luís Caldas (chief of mission)

References
Organizing Committee for the Games of the XXI Olympiad Montréal 1976 (1978). Official Report of the XXI Olympiad Montréal 1976, Volume 1: The organization (Retrieved on November 8, 2006).
Organizing Committee for the Games of the XXI Olympiad Montréal 1976 (1978). Official Report of the XXI Olympiad Montréal 1976, Volume 3: The results (Retrieved on November 8, 2006).
International Olympic Committee – Olympic medal winners database

Nations at the 1976 Summer Olympics
1976 Summer Olympics
1976 in Portuguese sport